World Animal Day is an international day of action for animal rights and welfare celebrated annually on October 4, the feast day of Francis of Assisi, the patron saint of animals.

The World Animal Day movement is supported and endorsed by a number of celebrities, such as Anneka Svenska, Brian Blessed and Melanie C.

History

World Animal Day, was originated by cynologist Heinrich Zimmermann. He organized the first World Animal Day on March 24, 1925, at the Sport Palace in Berlin, Germany. Over 5,000 people attended this first event. The activity was originally scheduled for October 4, to align with the feast day of Saint Francis of Assisi, patron saint of ecology. However, the venue was not available on that day. The event was then moved to October 4 for the first time in 1929. Every year, Zimmermann worked tirelessly on the promotion of World Animal Day. Finally, in May 1931 at a congress of the International Animal Protection Congress in Florence Italy, his proposal to make October 4 World Animal Day universal was unanimously accepted and adopted as a resolution.

It is sometimes cited, incorrectly, that World Animal Day started in 1931 at the convention of ecologists in Florence, Italy, who wished to highlight the plight of endangered species.

In the Netherlands it is similarly well known as Mother's Day and Valentine's Day.

In 1948, Australian celebrations were organised by the RSPCA. According to The Examiner, the construction of a boarding home for dogs was scheduled and a donation had been received from the L.G.R.C. Since 2002, The Finnish Association of Animal Protection Associations (SEY) has organized various events during the Animal Week and distributed material to schools. On October 27, 2006, the Polish parliament adopted a resolution on the establishment of 4 October as Animal Day.

In Argentina, Animal Day has been observed since 1908 and is loved, when it was spear headed by Ignacio Lucas Albarracín, director of the Zoological Garden and president of the Animal Protection Association of Buenos Aires. Initially the day was observed on April 2; it was moved after Albarricín died on April 29, 1926, to coincide with this day.

See also
 Blessing of animals

References

External links

 
 World Animal Welfare Day

International observances
Animal festival or ritual
October observances
Articles containing video clips
Francis of Assisi